Diego Adalberto Barrios Coronel (born 29 March 1987) is a Paraguayan football midfielder. He last played for NK Domžale in the Slovenian PrvaLiga.

He had previously played with Olimpia Asunción, Ecuatorian Deportivo Azogues and Croatian Prva HNL club NK Osijek.

External links 
 

1987 births
Living people
People from Concepción, Paraguay
Association football midfielders
Paraguayan footballers
Paraguayan expatriate footballers
Expatriate footballers in Ecuador
NK Domžale players
Expatriate footballers in Slovenia
Croatian Football League players
NK Osijek players
Expatriate footballers in Croatia